Robert White Hepburn (17 December 1901 – 1976) was a Scottish footballer who played as a goalkeeper.

Career
Born in Hamilton, Hepburn played club football for Dykehead, Ayr United and Stranraer, and made one appearance for Scotland in 1932.

References

1901 births
1976 deaths
Date of death missing
Scottish footballers
Scotland international footballers
Scottish Football League players
Scottish Junior Football Association players
Third Lanark A.C. players
Royal Albert F.C. players
Dykehead F.C. players
Ayr United F.C. players
Stranraer F.C. players
Association football goalkeepers
Footballers from Hamilton, South Lanarkshire
Royal Air Force personnel of World War II